Butchart is a surname that refers to:
Adrian Butchart (contemporary), British screenwriter and producer
Amber Butchart (contemporary), British fashion historian
Andrew Butchart (born 1991), British long-distance runner
Harvey Butchart (1907–2002), American mathematics professor and hiker
Iain Butchart (born 1960), Zimbabwean cricket player
Pamela Butchart, Scottish children's author